Alfred Sharp (3 February 1881 – 1 September 1966) was an Australian rules footballer who played for the Fitzroy Football Club and Carlton Football Club in the Victorian Football League (VFL).

When Sharp appeared for Fitzroy in the 1903 VFL Grand Final it was just his fifth league game and would also be the first loss of his career. He was a back pocket defender in Fitzroy's premiership winning team the following season.

He isn't known to have been related to premiership teammate Jim Sharp but did have a son, Mickey Sharp, who played for the club in the 1930s and early 1940s.

References

1881 births
Australian rules footballers from Melbourne
Fitzroy Football Club players
Fitzroy Football Club Premiership players
Carlton Football Club players
1966 deaths
One-time VFL/AFL Premiership players
People from Carlton, Victoria